Necdet Şentürk (born 30 November 1929) was a Turkish footballer. He competed in the men's tournament at the 1952 Summer Olympics.

Honours
Galatasaray
Istanbul Football League: 1955–56

References

External links
 

1928 births
Possibly living people
Turkish footballers
Olympic footballers of Turkey
Footballers at the 1952 Summer Olympics
People from Sivas
Association football midfielders
Ankara Keçiörengücü S.K. footballers
Galatasaray S.K. footballers